Partners in Crime is a 1928 American comedy silent film directed by Frank R. Strayer and written by George Marion Jr., Grover Jones and Gilbert Pratt. The film stars Wallace Beery, Raymond Hatton, Mary Brian, William Powell, Jack Luden, Arthur Housman and Albert Roccardi. The film was released on March 17, 1928, by Paramount Pictures. A print of the film exists in the Library of Congress film archive.

Plot

Cast 
Wallace Beery as Detective Mike Doolan
Raymond Hatton as 'Scoop' McGee, The Reporter
Mary Brian	as Marie Burke, The Cigarette Girl
William Powell as Smith
Jack Luden as Richard Demming, Assistant District Attorney
Arthur Housman as Barton
Albert Roccardi as Kanelli, The Restaurant Owner
Joseph W. Girard as Chief of Police
George Irving as B.R. Carnwall
Bruce Gordon as Dodo
Jack Richardson as Jake

References

External links 
 

1928 films
1920s English-language films
Silent American comedy films
1928 comedy films
Paramount Pictures films
Films directed by Frank R. Strayer
American black-and-white films
American silent feature films
1920s American films